Canonical model may refer to:

Canonical model, a design pattern used to communicate between different data formats
Canonical ring in mathematics
Kripke semantics#Canonical models in modal logic
Relative canonical model in mathematics

See also 
 Canonical ensemble